

Events 
Thomas Ravenscroft joins the choir of St Paul's Cathedral, London.
Alfonso Fontanelli and Carlo Gesualdo visit Venice, Florence, Naples, and Venosa.
Sethus Calvisius becomes Thomaskantor in Leipzig.

Publications 
Ippolito Baccusi
 for four voices, books 2 & 3 (Venice: Ricciardo Amadino), also includes a Magnificat
First book of madrigals for three voices (Venice: Ricciardo Amadino)
Girolamo Belli –  (Motets and a Magnificat) for ten voices (Venice: Ricciardo Amadino), also includes a mass for eight voices
Valerio Bona – Masses and motets for three voices (Milan: Francesco & Simon Tini), also includes a Magnificat for six voices
Sethus Calvisius –  (Sacred hymns in Latin and German) for four voices (Erfurt: Georg Baumann)
Giovanni Croce
First book of motets for eight voices (Venice: Giacomo Vincenti)
 (New musical thoughts) for five voices (Venice: Giacomo Vincenti)
Christoph Demantius –  (Leipzig: Zacharias Berwald), a wedding song
Scipione Dentice – First book of motets for five voices (Rome: Francesco Coattino)
Giovanni Dragoni – Fourth book of madrigals for five voices (Venice: Giacomo Vincenti)
Johannes Eccard
 ( for five voices (Königsberg: George Osterberg), a wedding song
 for five voices (Königsberg: George Osterberg), a graduation song
Carlo Gesualdo
First book of madrigals for five voices (Ferrara: Vittorio Baldini)
Second book of madrigals for five voices (Ferrara: Vittorio Baldini)
Adam Gumpelzhaimer –  (New German Sacred Songs) for four voices (Augsburg: Valentin Schönigk)
Johannes Herold –  for six voices (Grätz: Georg Widmanstetter)
Paolo Isnardi –  for eight voices (Venice: heirs of Girolamo Scotto)
Orlande de Lassus – Motets for six voices (Graz: Georg Widmanstetter)
Claude Le Jeune – Airs for four and five voices (Paris: Adrian Le Roy and the widow of R. Ballard)
Luzzasco Luzzaschi – Fourth book of madrigals for five voices (Ferrara: Vittorio Baldini)
Luca Marenzio – Sixth book of madrigals for five voices (Venice: Angelo Gardano)
Tiburtio Massaino – Fourth book of madrigals for five voices (Venice: Angelo Gardano)
Rinaldo del Mel
Fifth book of madrigals for five voices (Venice: Angelo Gardano)
Claudio Merulo – , book one for eight, ten, twelve, and sixteen voices (Venice: Angelo Gardano)
Philippe de Monte – Eighth book of madrigals for six voices (Venice: Angelo Gardano)
Thomas Morley – Madrigalls To Foure Voyces ... The First Booke (London: Thomas Este)
John Mundy – Songs and psalmes composed into 3. 4. and 5. parts (London: Thomas Este)
Giovanni Pierluigi da Palestrina
Sixth book of masses for four and five voices (Rome: Francesco Coattino)
Seventh book of masses for four and five voices (Rome: Francesco Coattino)
Andreas Raselius – , first  cycle covering the whole year to be written in the German language

Classical music 
Orlande de Lassus – Lagrime di San Pietro

Births 
February 5 – Biagio Marini, violinist and composer (d. 1663)
September 13 – Francesco Manelli, Italian composer and theorbist (died 1667)

Deaths 
February 2 – Giovanni Pierluigi da Palestrina, Italian composer (born c.1525)
June 14 – Orlande de Lassus, Flemish composer (born 1532)
July – Girolamo Mei, humanist and inspiration of the Florentine Camerata (b. 1519)
July 10 – Paolo Bellasio, organist and composer (b. 1554)

 
Music
16th century in music
Music by year